Howard Alexander Smith (January 30, 1880October 27, 1966) was an American lawyer and politician. A member of the Republican Party, he served as a United States Senator from New Jersey from 1944 to 1959. He was the uncle of Peter H. Dominick, who was a Senator from Colorado (1963–1975).

Early life and education
H. Alexander Smith was born in New York City to Abram Alexander and Sue Lehn (née Bender) Smith. His father was a physician and teacher. He attended the Cutler School in New York, and then enrolled at Princeton University in New Jersey. At Princeton, he studied jurisprudence, political science, and English common law under Woodrow Wilson. He graduated with a Bachelor of Arts degree in 1901, and later received a Bachelor of Laws degree from Columbia Law School in 1904.

Smith married Helen Dominick, whom he met during his time at Columbia, in 1902; the couple had two daughters and a son. One daughter, Helen Smith Shoemaker, was an author, sculptor and church leader. She married renowned Anglican Priest Sam Shoemaker in 1925.

Early career
In 1904, Smith was admitted to the New York State Bar Association and commenced his practice in New York City, working for the Legal Aid Society. Due to poor health, he moved to Colorado Springs, Colorado, where he continued to practice law until 1917. During World War I, he worked for the United States Food Administration in Colorado and afterwards in Washington, D.C. He moved to New Jersey in 1919, and served as executive secretary (assistant to the president) of Princeton University from 1920 to 1927. He then served as a lecturer in Princeton's department of politics (1927–1930), teaching international relations and foreign policy.

While continuing to live in New Jersey, Smith resumed his practice of law in New York City. He became active in state politics, helping establish the New Jersey Republican Policy Council in 1933 and being appointed treasurer of the New Jersey Republican State Committee in 1934. He was later elected chairman of the Republican State Committee, and served as a member of the Republican National Committee (1942–1943).

U.S. Senate
He was elected on November 7, 1944, as a Republican to the United States Senate to fill the vacancy in the term ending January 3, 1947, caused by the death of W. Warren Barbour.

He was reelected in 1946 and 1952 and served from December 7, 1944, to January 3, 1959. He served as chairman of the Senate Committee on Labor and Public Welfare (1953–1955), and co-authored the Smith–Mundt Act to specify the terms in which the United States government can engage in public diplomacy. He was not a candidate for renomination in 1958, but served as a special consultant on foreign affairs to the US Secretary of State from 1959 to 1960. Smith voted in favor of the Civil Rights Act of 1957.

Smith died in Princeton at age 86, and is buried in Princeton Cemetery.

References

1880 births
1966 deaths
20th-century American politicians
Burials at Princeton Cemetery
Chairmen of the New Jersey Republican State Committee
Columbia Law School alumni
New Jersey Republicans
Princeton University alumni
Republican Party United States senators from New Jersey